Roriz may refer to:

Roriz (Barcelos), a parish in the municipality of Barcelos, Portugal
Roriz (Chaves), a parish in the municipality of Chaves, Portugal
Roriz (Santo Tirso), a parish in the municipality of Santo Tirso, Portugal
João Pedro Roriz, a Brazilian actor and writer
Aydano Antonio Freitas Roriz (*1949), Brazilian writer and editor
Joaquim Roriz (c. 1936-2018), Brazilian politician